Michel Jean-Pierre Debré (15 January 1912 – 2 August 1996) was the first Prime Minister of the French Fifth Republic. He is considered the "father" of the current Constitution of France. He served under President Charles de Gaulle from 1959 to 1962. In terms of political personality, Debré was intense and immovable and had a tendency to rhetorical extremism.

Early life
Debré was born in Paris, the son of Jeanne-Marguerite (Debat-Ponsan) and Robert Debré, a well-known professor of medicine, who is today considered by many to be the founder of modern pediatrics. His maternal grandfather was academic painter Édouard Debat-Ponsan. Debré's father was Jewish, and his grandfather was a rabbi. Debré himself was Roman Catholic.

He studied at the Lycée Montaigne and then at the Lycée Louis-le-Grand, obtained a diploma from the École Libre des Sciences Politiques, and a PhD in Law from the University of Paris. He then became a Professor of Law at the University of Paris. He also joined the École des Officiers de Réserve de la Cavalerie (Reserve Cavalry-Officers School) in Saumur. In 1934, at the age of twenty-two, Debré passed the entrance exam and became a member of the Conseil d'État. In 1938, he joined the staff of the Economy Minister Paul Reynaud.

Early career
In 1939, at the beginning of the Second World War, Debré was enlisted as a cavalry officer. He was taken prisoner in Artenay in June 1940 during the Battle of France but managed to escape in September. He returned to the Conseil d'État, now under the administration of the Vichy regime and was sworn in by Marshal Philippe Pétain. In 1942, he was promoted to maître des requêtes by the Minister of Justice. After the German invasion of the free zone in November 1942, Debré's political Pétainism disappeared, and in February 1943, he became involved in the French Resistance by joining the network Ceux de la Résistance (CDLR).

During the summer of 1943, General Charles de Gaulle gave Debré the task of making a list of prefects, ho would replace those of the Vichy regime after the Liberation. In August 1944, de Gaulle made him Commissaire de la République for Angers, and in 1945, the Provisional Government charged him with the task of reforming the French Civil Service. Debré created the École nationale d'administration, whose idea was formulated by Jean Zay before the war.

Under the Fourth Republic, Debré at first supported the Democratic and Socialist Union of the Resistance but defected to the Radical-Socialist Party on the advice de Gaulle, who reportedly told him and several other politicians, including Jacques Chaban-Delmas, Allez au parti radical. C'est là que vous trouverez les derniers vestiges du sens de l'Etat. ("Go to the Radical Party. It's there that you will find the last vestiges of the meaning of the state".)

Debré then joined the Rally of the French People and was elected senator of Indre-et-Loire, a position that he held from 1948 to 1958. In 1957, he founded Le Courrier de la colère, a newspaper that fiercely defended French Algeria and called for the return to power of de Gaulle. In the 2 December 1957 issue, Debré wrote:

The explicit appeal to the insurgency led the socialist politician Alain Savary to write, "In the case of the OAS insurgency, the soldiers are not the culprit; the culprit is Debré".

Family
Michel Debré had four sons: Vincent Debré (1939–), businessman; François Debré (1942–2020), journalist; Bernard Debré (1944–2020), urologist and politician; and his fraternal twin, Jean-Louis Debré, politician. See Debré family.

Government

Michel Debré became the Garde des Sceaux (Minister of Justice) in the cabinet of General de Gaulle on 1 June 1958. He played an important role in drafting the Constitution of the Fifth Republic, and on its acceptance he took up the new position of Prime Minister of France, which he held from 8 January 1959 to 1962.

After the 1962 Évian Accords referendum that ended the Algerian War and gave self-determination to Algeria was approved by a nearly ten-to-one margin, de Gaulle replaced Debré with Georges Pompidou. In November, during the parliamentary elections that followed the dissolution of the National Assembly, Debré tried to be elected as deputy for Indre-et-Loire. Defeated, he in March 1963 decided to go to Réunion, an island that he had visited for less than 24 hours on 10 July 1959, on a trip with President de Gaulle. The choice reflects Debré's fear that what remained of the French colonial empires would follow the path trodden by Algeria: that of independence for which he was not sympathetic.

Debré wanted to take action against the Communist Party of Réunion, which had been founded by Paul Vergès a few years earlier. The movement sought self-determination for the island and the removal of its position as an overseas department and had staged demonstrations on the island a few days earlier. He also noted that the invalidation of Gabriel Macé's election as Mayor of Saint-Denis rendered the post open to the opposition and so he took the decision to contest it.

Debré returned in the government in 1966 as Economy and Finance Minister. After the May 1968 crisis, he became Foreign Minister and, one year later, served as Defence Minister of President Georges Pompidou. In that role, he became a hated figure of the left because of his determination to expropriate the land of 107 peasant farmers and shepherds on the Larzac plateau to extend an existing military base. The resulting civil disobedience campaign was ultimately victorious.

Considered as a guardian of the Gaullist orthodoxy, Debré was marginalised after the election of Valéry Giscard d'Estaing as President of France in 1974, whose foreign policy Debré criticised with virulence. In 1979, Debré took a major part in the Rally for the Republic (RPR) campaign against European federalism and was elected member of the European Parliament to defend the principle of the Europe of nations. However, Debré later accused Jacques Chirac, and the RPR moderated their speech. Debré was a dissident candidate in the 1981 presidential election but obtained only 1.6% of votes.

Politics in Réunion
Michel Debré arrived on the island of Réunion in April 1963 and succeeded in being elected Député for Saint-Denis on 6 May despite local opposition to the ordonnance Debré, a law that he had introduced in 1960 to allow civil servants in the overseas departments and territories of France to be recalled to Metropolitan France if they were suspected of disturbing public order. Supported by those who rejected autonomy, he immediately became the leader of the local right wing. That state of affairs would be challenged by Pierre Lagourgue that during the next decade.

To justify the departmentalization of the island that occurred in 1946 and to preserve its inhabitants from the temptation of independence, Debré implemented an economic development policy and opened the island's first family planning center. He personally fought to get Paris to create a second secondary school on the south of the island, in Le Tampon, when at the time there was only one, the Lycée Leconte-de-Lisle, which catered for many thousands of inhabitants.

From 1968 to 1982, Debré forcibly relocated over 2,000 children from Réunion to France, to work as free labour in Creuse. The plight of those children, known as Les enfants de la Creuse, was brought to light in 2002 when the Réunion exile Jean-Jacques Martial made a legal complaint against Debré, who had organised the controversial displacement, for "kidnapping of a minor, roundup and deportation". In 2005, a similar case was brought against the French Government by the Association of Réunion of Creuse.

Political career

Governmental functions

Keeper of the Seals, Minister of Justice: 1958–1959.
Prime Minister: 1959–1962.
Minister of Economy and Finance: 1966–1968.
Minister of Foreign Affairs: 1968–1969.
Minister of Defense: 1969–1973.

Electoral mandates

European Parliament

Member of European Parliament: 1979–1980 (Resignation). Elected in 1979.

Senate of France

Senator of Indre-et-Loire: 1948–1959 Became Prime minister in 1959. Elected in 1948, reelected in 1954.

National Assembly

Member of the National Assembly of France for Réunion: 1963–1966 (Became minister in 1966), 1973–1988. Elected in 1963, reelected in 1967, 1968, 1973, 1978, 1981, 1986.

General Council

General councillor of Indre-et-Loire: 1951–1970. Reelected in 1958, 1964.

Municipal Council

Mayor of Amboise: 1966–1989. Reelected in 1971, 1977, 1983.
Municipal councillor of Amboise: 1959–1989. Reelected in 1965, 1971, 1977, 1983.

Debré's Government, 8 January 1959 – 14 April 1962
Michel Debré – Prime Minister
Maurice Couve de Murville – Minister of Foreign Affairs
Pierre Guillaumat – Minister of Armies
Jean Berthoin – Minister of the Interior
Antoine Pinay – Minister of Finance and Economic Affairs
Jean-Marcel Jeanneney – Minister of Commerce and Industry
Paul Bacon – Minister of Labour
Edmond Michelet – Minister of Justice
André Boulloche – Minister of National Education
Raymond Triboulet – Minister of Veteran Affairs
André Malraux – Minister of Cultural Affairs
Roger Houdet – Minister of Agriculture
Robert Buron – Minister of Public Works and Transport
Bernard Chenot – Minister of Public Health and Population
Bernard Cornut-Gentille – Minister of Posts and Telecommunications
Roger Frey – Minister of Information
Pierre Sudreau – Minister of Construction

Changes
27 March 1959 – Robert Lecourt enters the Cabinet as Minister of Cooperation.
27 May 1959 – Henri Rochereau succeeds Houdet as Minister of Agriculture.
28 May 1959 – Pierre Chatenet succeeds Berthoin as Minister of the Interior.
23 December 1959 – Debré succeeds Boulloche as interim Minister of National Education.
13 January 1960 – Wilfrid Baumgartner succeeds Pinay as Minister of Finance and Economic Affairs.
15 January 1960 – Louis Joxe succeeds Debré as Minister of National Education
5 February 1960 – Pierre Messmer succeeds Guillaumat as Minister of Armies. Robert Lecourt becomes Minister of Overseas Departments and Territories and of the Sahara. His previous office of Minister of Cooperation is abolished. Michel Maurice-Bokanowski succeeds Cornut-Gentille as Minister of Posts and Telecommunications. Louis Terrenoire succeeds Frey as Minister of Information.
23 November 1960 – Louis Joxe becomes Minister of Algerian Affairs. Pierre Guillaumat succeeds Joxe as interim Minister of National Education.
20 February 1961 – Lucien Paye succeeds Guillaumat as Minister of National Education.
6 May 1961 – Roger Frey succeeds Chatenet as Minister of the Interior.
18 May 1961 – Jean Foyer enters the ministry as Minister of Cooperation.
24 August 1961 – Bernard Chenot succeeds Michelet as Minister of Justice. Joseph Fontanet succeeds Chenot as Minister of Public Health and Population. Edgard Pisani succeeds Rochereau as Minister of Agriculture. Louis Jacquinot succeeds Lecourt as Minister of Overseas Departments and Territories and Sahara. Terrenoire ceases to be Minister of Information, and the office is abolished.
19 January 1962 – Valéry Giscard d'Estaing succeeds Baumgartner as Minister of Finance and Economic Affairs.

References

Further reading
 Wahl, Nicholas. "The Constitutional Ideas of Michel Debré." Theory and Politics/Theorie und Politik. Springer Netherlands, 1971. 259–271.
 Wilsford, David, ed. Political leaders of contemporary Western Europe: a biographical dictionary (Greenwood, 1995) pp. 97–105

Primary sources
Debré, Michel. "The principles of our defence policy: Revue de Défense Nationale (Paris) 26 année August/September 1970." Survival 12#11 (1970): 376–383.
 

|-

|-

|-

|-

1912 births
1996 deaths
Politicians from Paris
French Roman Catholics
Democratic and Socialist Union of the Resistance politicians
Radical Party (France) politicians
Rally of the French People politicians
Union for the New Republic politicians
Union of Democrats for the Republic politicians
Rally for the Republic politicians
Prime Ministers of France
French Foreign Ministers
French Ministers of Justice
French Ministers of National Education
French Ministers of Finance
French Ministers of Veterans Affairs
French Senators of the Fourth Republic
Senators of Indre-et-Loire
Deputies of the 2nd National Assembly of the French Fifth Republic
Deputies of the 3rd National Assembly of the French Fifth Republic
Deputies of the 4th National Assembly of the French Fifth Republic
Deputies of the 5th National Assembly of the French Fifth Republic
Deputies of the 6th National Assembly of the French Fifth Republic
Deputies of the 7th National Assembly of the French Fifth Republic
Deputies of the 8th National Assembly of the French Fifth Republic
Candidates in the 1981 French presidential election
20th-century French lawyers
French Army personnel of World War II
French people of Jewish descent
French people of the Algerian War
Jewish French politicians
Lycée Louis-le-Grand alumni
Lycée Montaigne (Paris) alumni
Sciences Po alumni
Members of the Académie Française
Commandeurs of the Légion d'honneur
French Army officers
French prisoners of war in World War II
World War II prisoners of war held by Germany
French escapees
Escapees from German detention
Members of Parliament for Réunion